Madrugada is the fifth studio album by the Norwegian band Madrugada. It was released by the band's own label, Malabar Recording Company (distributed by EMI records), on 21 January 2008.

The album was produced by Madrugada and John Agnello who also produced the band's 2001 release The Nightly Disease as well as My Midnight Creeps' second album Histamin. The album was largely recorded during May 2007 at Water Music Studios, Hoboken, New Jersey and the Magic Shop, New York.

Despite the sudden death of guitarist Robert Burås during the recording of the album, Sivert Høyem and Frode Jacobsen soon decided to continue with the completion of the release. The majority of Burås' guitar parts had been recorded when he died, and the rest of Madrugada stated that finishing the album was like therapy for them.

Finishing touches and mixing was done in Svenska Grammofon Studio in Gothenburg, Sweden.

The band announced that they would embark on one final tour and they performed their last concert on 15 November 2008 at Oslo Spektrum. However, in June 2018 it was announced that Høyem, Jacobsen and original drummer Jon Lauvland Pettersen had reformed the band for a series of shows in 2019.

In 2008, the album has sold 82,400 copies in Norway.

Track listing
Music by Madrugada. All lyrics by Sivert Høyem, except track 9 by Robert Burås
 "Whatever Happened To You?" – 5:40
 "The Hour of the Wolf" – 4:29
 "Look Away Lucifer" – 5:13
 "Honey Bee" – 5:35
 "New Woman/New Man" – 4:22
 "What's on Your Mind?" – 4:03
 "Highway of Light" – 6:38
 "Valley of Deception" – 5:09
 "Our Time Won't Live That Long" – 5:55

References

 

2008 albums
Madrugada (band) albums
Albums produced by John Agnello